Nam On is one of the 29 constituencies in the Sai Kung District.

The constituency returns one district councillor to the Sai Kung District Council, with an election every four years.

Nam On constituency is loosely based on East Point City, Nan Fung Plaza and On Ning Garden in Tseung Kwan O with estimated population of 18,364.

Councillors represented

Election results

2010s

References

Tseung Kwan O
Constituencies of Hong Kong
Constituencies of Sai Kung District Council
2007 establishments in Hong Kong
Constituencies established in 2007